ASNC may refer to:
 American Society of Nuclear Cardiology
 Australasian Steam Navigation Company
 Department of Anglo-Saxon, Norse and Celtic, University of Cambridge